An unplanned extubation occurs when a patient is on mechanical ventilation and their endotracheal tube is removed when it was not supposed to be. If the patient themselves intentionally removes their own tube, this is known as self-extubation or deliberate unplanned extubation, whereas if the tube is removed by health professionals, or a patient removes it by accident, it is referred to as accidental extubation. Estimates of the incidence of unplanned extubation among patients in intensive care units range from 3.4% to 22.5%. Unplanned extubation can increase the amount of time a patient must remain on mechanical ventilation, the duration of the patient's hospital stay, and the patient's medical costs. It is also estimated that 60% of patients who experience an unplanned extubation require re-intubation, which may increase the risk of ventilator-associated pneumonia.

References

Mechanical ventilation
Complications of surgical and medical care